Goshen Swamp is a blackwater creek swamp located in Duplin County, North Carolina, near the towns of Faison and Calypso.  It is a tributary of the Northeast Cape Fear River and has a watershed area of 479 km2.

References

Landforms of Duplin County, North Carolina
Swamps of North Carolina